The 2010–11 Kategoria Superiore was the 72nd official season, or the 75th season of top-tier football in Albania (including three unofficial championships of WW2) and the thirteenth season under the name Kategoria Superiore. The season began on 21 August 2010 and ended on 16 May 2011. Dinamo Tirana were the defending champions, having won their 18th Albanian championship last season.

The championship was won by Skënderbeu, with Flamurtari and Vllaznia finishing second and third, respectively. On the bottom end of the table, Besa and Elbasani were directly relegated, while Shkumbini and Dinamo Tirana had to compete in the relegation playoffs.

Teams
Apolonia Fier and Gramozi were directly relegated to the Kategoria e Parë after finishing 11th and 12th in the previous year's standings. They are replaced by Kategoria e Parë champions Bylis and runners-up Elbasani.

9th placed Kastrioti and 10th placed Skënderbeu had to compete in single-match relegation play-offs. Kastrioti played against Kategoria e Parë fourth-placed club Lushnja, while Skënderbeu played against Kategoria e Parë third-placed club Kamza. Both Kastrioti and Skënderbeu won their matches 1–0 and retained their places in the league.

Stadia and last season

Personnel and sponsoring

Managerial changes
The Managerial changes:

League table

Results
The schedule consisted of three rounds. During the first two rounds, each team played each other once home and away for a total of 22 matches. The pairings of the third round were then set according to the standings after the first two rounds, giving every team a third game against each opponent for a total of 33 games per team.

First and second round

Third round

Positions by round

Relegation playoffs
The 9th and 10th-place finishers in the league faced the sixth- and fifth-placed teams of the 2010–11 Kategoria e Parë, respectively, in single match relegation playoffs.

All times CEST

Top scorers

Source:

See also
 2010–11 Albanian Cup
 2010–11 KF Tirana season

References

External links
 Official website 

2010-11
2010–11 in European association football leagues
1